(born November 19, 1970 in Chiba) is a retired boxer from Japan, who competed for his native country at the 1992 Summer Olympics in Barcelona, Spain.

Japan sent four boxers to the Barcelona Games. Dobashi competed in the Men's Lightweight (– 60 kg) division. He defeated Jamaica's Delroy Leslie in the first round on points (11:5) before falling to France's Julien Lorcy (RSC-2) in the second round.

References
Profile

1970 births
Living people
People from Chiba (city)
Lightweight boxers
Boxers at the 1992 Summer Olympics
Olympic boxers of Japan
Japanese male boxers
20th-century Japanese people